Zhang Hanyun (born 9 April 1989), also known as Baby Zhang or Kristy Zhang, is a Chinese singer and actress. At the age of 16, Kristy rose to fame as a runner-up of the singing contest Super Girl 2004.

Early life
Zhang was born and raised in Deyang, Sichuan and is an only child. She graduated from high school in Beijing in 2006. Zhang is able to speak Mandarin, Cantonese, and conversational English.

Career
Zhang released her debut album, I am just Zhang Hanyun, in 2005 and her second album, Power of Young in 2007.

Discography

Albums

Singles

Filmography

Film

Television series

Variety show

Awards

References

External links 
 Baby Zhang's Official Website
 Baby Zhang FC Vietnamese

1989 births
Living people
People from Deyang
Super Girl contestants
Singers from Sichuan
Chinese television actresses
21st-century Chinese actresses
Actresses from Sichuan